Saints Nunilo and Alodia (died c. 842/51) were a pair of child martyrs from Huesca. Born of a mixed marriage, they eschewed the Islam of their father in favour of their mother's Christianity. They were executed by the Muslim authorities of Huesca in accordance with sharia law as apostates. Their feast day is 22 October.

The girls were arrested during the persecutions conducted by Abd ar-Rahman II, the Emir of Córdoba. When they refused to disavow their faith they were placed in a brothel and later beheaded. Their relics were revered at the monastery of Leyre in the tenth and eleventh centuries, when a portal was fashioned bearing their image, which still survives.

The Translatio sanctarum Nunilonis et Alodiae, a short account of the translation of their relics to the monastery of Leyre in 851, survives in two tenth-century manuscripts. The children's relics were translated from Huesca to Leyre by Oneca, the wife of Íñigo Arista, King of Navarre; they were later contained in the Leyre Casket, an ornate ivory casket produced in 1004/5 in Muslim Cordoba. There are some discrepancies between the account of the martyrdom in the Translatio and that recorded by Eulogius of Córdoba.

References

 Catlos, Brian A. The Victors and the Vanquished: Christians and Muslims of Catalonia and Aragon, 1050–1300. Cambridge: Cambridge University Press, 2004. .
 Collins, Roger. The Basques. London: Blackwell Publishing, 1990. .

External links
 http://www.santiebeati.it/dettaglio/74810
 http://saints.sqpn.com/saint-nunilo-of-huesca/
 http://saints.sqpn.com/saint-alodia-of-huesca/

Saints duos
9th-century Christian saints
Christian child saints
Spanish Roman Catholic saints
Christians executed for refusing to convert to Islam
9th-century Christian martyrs
Converts to Christianity from Islam
Spanish former Muslims
Christian saints killed by Muslims
Year of birth unknown
Christian female saints of the Middle Ages
9th-century Spanish women